
Kenneth, Ken or Kenny Walker may refer to:

Sports

American football
 Kenny Walker (American football) (born 1967), American football defensive lineman
 Kenneth Walker III (wide receiver) (born 1994), American football wide receiver
 Kenneth Walker III (running back) (born 2000), American football running back

Other sports
 Ken Walker (footballer) (1919–2013), Australian rules footballer
 Kenneth Walker (Australian cricketer) (born 1941), Australian cricketer
 Kenny Walker (basketball) (born 1964), American basketball player
 Kenneth Walker (English cricketer) (born 1970), English cricketer

Other
 Kenneth Walker (author) (1882–1966), British author
 Kenneth Walker (general) (1898–1943), U.S. Army aviator and general
 Ken Walker (physician) (born 1924), Canadian physician and author
 Kenneth Walker (politician) (born 1953), member of the Mississippi House of Representatives
 Kenneth Walker, boyfriend of Breonna Taylor, who was shot by police in Louisville, Kentucky, U.S.

See also
 Kenneth Walker Marshall (1911–1992), Scottish international rugby and cricket player